Finch Avenue is an arterial thoroughfare that travels east–west in Toronto, Ontario, Canada. The road continues west into the Regional Municipality of Peel as Regional Road 2 and east into the Regional Municipality of Durham as Regional Road 37.

The road is considered a high-density transit corridor by Metrolinx. At its intersection with Yonge Street in North York, the Finch subway station and the Finch Bus Terminal carry some of the highest numbers of commuters in the city.

History

Finch Avenue was named after hotel owner John Finch, who operated John Finch's Hotel at the northeast corner of Finch Avenue and Yonge Street.  The road allowance was a concession road, and at one time, there were a number of older churches, schoolhouses, and cemeteries on each side of the road. In the 1950s, Ontario Hydro built a series of transmission lines around Toronto, and paralleled Finch from Highway 400 eastward into Pickering. A compressed natural gas pipeline also follows this routing.

As suburban development in North York progressed northward in the 1960s, Finch was rapidly reconstructed from a gravel road into a four-laned traffic artery. This began with the realignment of several sections, such as at Bayview where Newtonbrook Creek flows diagonally beneath the crossroads. A rail overpass west of Leslie was built by 1968.

In the west, Finch originally ended at the Humber River at Islington Avenue. A separate western section was later constructed as development occurred in the-then Borough of Etobicoke. Traffic proceeding west had to travel on Islington, south across the Humber to Albion Road, and west beyond Kipling Avenue to reach it. In the early 1990s, this gap was closed. Earlier, in the 1980s a short extension was built northwestward into Mississauga and Brampton with the construction of Highway 427, following the former Toronto Gore Township Concession 3, which originally spurred off Indian Line, the precursor to the 427. Finch ends at Steeles Avenue, and Gorewood Drive continues it for a short distance north of Highway 407, where the concession is cut off by the Claireville Conservation Area. The concession is then called McVean Drive in northeastern Brampton, north of Queen Street, the former Highway 7. It then continues into Caledon as Centreville Creek Road.

On August 19, 2005, a freak rainstorm in Toronto caused the Black Creek water level to rise, which caused a section of Finch Avenue West near Sentinel Road (due south of York University between Keele and Jane Streets) to collapse, leaving a deep pit that prevented any pedestrian or vehicular traffic from passing through. The crater left where a 4 lane roadway once was is approximately 20–25 feet (7 metres) deep. Two lanes reopened in late 2005, and the remaining lanes opened in April 2006. On July 24, 2009, two sinkholes appeared on Finch Avenue West between Dufferin Street and Bathurst Street.

Route description

Despite its length (one of the longest streets in the Greater Toronto Area), few major landmarks are on Finch; it runs primarily through business and residential areas. The North York City Centre area, which runs south from Finch's intersection with Yonge Street, has many condominium and office high-rises.
 
Most of Finch Avenue west of Morningside Avenue is a four- to six-lane principal arterial, with a speed limit of 60 km/h (35–40 mph) in most sections. East of Morningside, Finch Av. E becomes Staines Rd., a collector road that runs through residential communities, northeast to Steeles Av. E. East of Morningside the road is signed as Old Finch Avenue requiring connections with several north-south streets (Sewells Road, Meadowvale Road and Plug Hat Road) before continues briefly at the south end of Beare Road. Heading east it enters into the City of Pickering in Durham Region after Scarborough-Pickering Townline where it is also known as Durham Regional Road 37.

In Pickering, Finch Avenue is also known as Durham Road # 37 and continues east to Brock Road (Durham Regional Road 1). It ends at a cul-de-sac at Kingston Road (Durham Regional Highway 2 and formerly provincial Highway 2), and Kingston Rd. continues the concession line to the eastern boundary of Oshawa.

In Mississauga and Brampton, Finch Avenue is designated as Peel Regional Road 2, and is the shortest road corridor under the jurisdiction of the Region of Peel.

Public transit
Finch subway station on the eastern branch of Line 1 Yonge–University of the Toronto subway is located at the intersection of Finch Avenue and Yonge Street. It is the northern terminus of the eastern branch and is a major regional transit hub. The Finch Bus Terminal, a hub for GO Transit, York Region Transit and Viva buses, is next to the station. Finch Avenue is served by buses of the Toronto Transit Commission 24 hours a day through regular routes (36 Finch West and 39 Finch East) and Blue Night Network routes (336 Finch West and 339 Finch East). One express route, 939 Finch Express, provides faster transit along Finch Avenue and connects to Scarborough Centre station on Line 3 Scarborough in the east.

West of Humberwood avenue, the TTC 36/336 diverge, and Brampton transit buses take over. The Brampton Transit 11 Steeles operates westward only to Steeles, and the 511 Züm Steeles operates express from Steeles.

Finch West station on the western branch of Line 1, was opened on December 17, 2017, and is located at the intersection of Finch Avenue and Keele Street. In 2007, former mayor David Miller proposed the construction of several light rail lines under the Transit City plan, one of which was Line 6 Finch West, which was proposed to operated between Humber College in the west and Finch West station in the east. After the succeeding mayor, Rob Ford, intermittently abandoning the proposal, the line was later approved for funding by Metrolinx and had been scheduled for completion in 2022, but after consultation with Mosaic Transit Group, the consortium selected to build the line for a construction schedule, Metrolinx delayed completion of the line to 2023.

Landmarks and neighbourhoods
Points of interest along Finch from west to east:

 Wet'n'Wild Toronto — at Steeles Avenue
 Malton
 Indian Line Campground — near Highway 427
 Humber College Main Campus — near Highway 27
 Etobicoke General Hospital
 Rexdale
 The Albion Centre — at Albion Road and Kipling Avenue
 Thistletown
 Emery — at Weston Road
 York-Finch Hospital — Humber River Regional
 Jane and Finch
 Yorkgate Mall — near Jane Street
 Norfinch Mall — near Jane Street
 Jane Finch Mall — near Jane Street
 Finch West station — at Keele Street
 G. Ross Lord Dam and Reservoir, on the Don River (Western Branch), at Dufferin Street
 North York Branson Hospital, near Bathurst Street
 Herb Carnegie North York Centennial Recreation Complex (opposite Branson)
 Esther Shiner Stadium, behind Northview Heights SS at Bathurst
 Finch station and Finch Bus Terminal — at Yonge Street.
 Finch Parkette — site of John Finch's Hotel and tavern in 1848; demolished in 1873
 Historic Zion Schoolhouse near Leslie Street
 Old Cummer GO Station at Leslie Street
 Seneca College Newnham Campus at Highway 404
 Bridlewood Mall at Warden Avenue
 Scarborough General Hospital Birchmount Campus (Formerly Scarborough Grace Hospital) at Birchmount Road
 Woodside Square Mall at McCowan Road
 Malvern
 Rouge Park at the Rouge River
 Toronto Zoo

Former sections
Pawnee Avenue is a former alignment of Finch Avenue. Pawnee Avenue runs along the former North York Township road alignment between Highway 404 and Victoria Park Avenue. Old Finch Avenue (despite its name, there is no "New" Finch) is a separate part of the present road alignment severed from the main section of the street after a northward arc in its course was partially incorporated into a northerly extension of Morningside Avenue, creating a jog. It runs from Morningside Avenue to east of Sewells Road in northeastern Scarborough, and ends at the western boundary of Rouge Park.

References

External links

Etobicoke-Finch West LRT details at City of Toronto website

Roads in Toronto
Roads in Brampton